Market Centre may refer to:

The Market Centre, a shopping mall on Main Street, Letterkenny, Ireland
The Market Centre, a shopping mall in Crewe, England
Market centre, a location in Cockermouth, England

See also
Market square
Market Center (disambiguation)